The Hockey East Three-Stars Award is an annual award given out at the conclusion of the Hockey East regular season to the player who has the highest number of points with respect to being named a star-of-the-game. At the conclusion of each game the members of the media decide the three stars of the game, awarding five points for being named as the first star, three points for a second star and one point for a third star. Only conference games are counted in the standings for the Three-Stars Award.

The Three-Stars Award was first bestowed in 2001 and every year thereafter. The overall standings have resulted in a tie six times, the latest instance being the second three-way tie in 2020–21. In 2022-23, Lane Hutson became the first defenceman to win the award in league history.

Award winners

Winners by school

Winners by position

See also
Hockey East Awards

References

General

Specific

External links
Hockey East Awards (Incomplete)

College ice hockey trophies and awards in the United States